Richard Hunt (August 17, 1951 – January 7, 1992) was an American puppeteer, best known as a Muppet performer on Sesame Street, The Muppet Show, Fraggle Rock, and other projects for The Jim Henson Company. His roles on The Muppet Show included Scooter, Statler, Janice, Beaker, and Sweetums and characters on Sesame Street include Gladys the Cow, Don Music, and Forgetful Jones.

Early life
Hunt was born in The Bronx, New York. The family eventually moved to Closter, New Jersey some years later.

Hunt came from a family of performers. As a student in middle school and high school, he put on puppet shows for local children, and was a fan of the then-fledgling Muppets. After high school graduation, and a four-month stint of doing weather reports at a local radio station, Hunt pursued a meeting with Jim Henson. He cold-called from a payphone and was invited to audition.

Career
After being hired to work on Sesame Street, Hunt mostly performed background characters. One of his first major performances was as Taminella Grinderfall in The Frog Prince, physically performing the character while Jerry Juhl portrayed the voice. Hunt performed Scooter and shared Miss Piggy with Frank Oz until the final quarter of the first season of The Muppet Show.

His characters on Sesame Street included Forgetful Jones, Placido Flamingo, Don Music, Gladys the Cow, and Sully; Hunt also briefly performed Elmo before Kevin Clash was cast in that role. On Fraggle Rock, Hunt's main role was the performing the facial expressions and voice of Junior Gorg; he also performed Gunge (one of the Trash Heap's barkers) as well as several one-shot or minor characters.

Hunt also worked as a director of several home video releases such as Sing-Along, Dance-Along, Do-Along and Elmo's Sing-Along Guessing Game, as well as an episode of Fraggle Rock. Hunt was close friends with fellow puppeteer Jerry Nelson. Several of their characters were paired, such as Nelson's Floyd Pepper with Hunt's Janice; the Two-Headed Monster; and Nelson's Pa Gorg to Hunt's Junior Gorg on Fraggle Rock.

Personal life
Hunt was gay. When Rudolf Nureyev, also openly gay, made a guest appearance on The Muppet Show, Nureyev bluntly flirted with Hunt backstage.  Hunt was in a relationship with Nelson Bird, a painter from Alabama, until his death in 1985.

Because he was too ill with AIDS to do so, Hunt was the only Muppet Show puppeteer who did not return for The Muppet Christmas Carol, which is dedicated to his memory as well as that of Jim Henson. Hunt died in January 1992, ahead of the film's release that December.

Mark Hamill told the Milwaukee Journal Sentinel during a chat in November 2003 that he became friends with Hunt during his Muppet Show appearance, and that "[Hunt] became one of the best friends my family has ever had."

Death and legacy
On January 7, 1992, Hunt died of HIV/AIDS related complications at Cabrini Hospice in Manhattan, aged 40. He was cremated, and some of his ashes were sprinkled over the flower beds at the Hunt Family home in Closter, New Jersey. The Muppet Christmas Carol was dedicated to his memory.

Following Hunt's death, the roles of Scooter and Janice were reassigned to David Rudman in 2008. The roles of Beaker and Statler, likewise, were reassigned to Steve Whitmire and Jerry Nelson, respectively, with Whitmire performing Statler fulltime later in 2002. As of 2017, Beaker is now performed by Rudman, and Statler by Peter Linz. John Henson was cast as Sweetums shortly prior to Hunt's death, having initially been trained by Hunt for physical performances in the attraction Muppet*Vision 3D, before Matt Vogel was cast in the role in 2009.

On Sesame Street, Hunt's roles of Sully, Sonny Friendly, and the right head of the Two-Headed Monster were also reassigned to Rudman until the former two were eventually retired, while the role of Gladys the Cow is now performed by Jennifer Barnhart.  The role of Don Music has been performed by Ryan Dillon since 2019.

Filmography

References

External links
 
 
 Muppet Central's Tribute to Richard Hunt

1951 births
1992 deaths
20th-century American male actors
AIDS-related deaths in New York (state)
American male film actors
American television directors
American male voice actors
American puppeteers
Fraggle Rock performers
American gay actors
LGBT people from New York (state)
LGBT puppeteers
LGBT television directors
LGBT film directors
Muppet performers
People from Closter, New Jersey
Entertainers from the Bronx
Sesame Street Muppeteers
Primetime Emmy Award winners
Film directors from New Jersey
Film directors from New York (state)
20th-century American LGBT people